Hortelã is a settlement in the western part of the island of São Nicolau, Cape Verde. In 2010 its population was 181. It is situated at the southern foot of Monte Gordo, 5 km north of Tarrafal de São Nicolau and 6 km west of Ribeira Brava.

See also
List of villages and settlements in Cape Verde

References

Villages and settlements in São Nicolau, Cape Verde
Tarrafal de São Nicolau